State Route 203 (SR 203) is a  state highway in Tennessee that runs in an east-to-west direction from the city of Collinwood, in Wayne County to the city of Savannah in Hardin County. The highway lies both in Middle and West Tennessee.

Route description

Hardin County

SR 203 begins in Hardin County in West Tennessee in Savannah at  an intersection with SR 69 in downtown, just feet from that highway's intersection with US 64/SR 15 and SR 128. It goes east through some neighborhoods before leaving Savannah and passing through Olivet, where it has a short concurrency with SR 226, before continuing east through rural areas. The highway then enters the mountains of the Highland Rim and passes through them for several miles before crossing into Wayne County and Middle Tennessee.

Wayne County

SR 203 continues east through the mountains and passes through Lutts, where it makes a sharp right turn onto Bear Creek Road. The highway then continues east through the mountains to enter Collinwood, where it comes to an end at an intersection with SR 13 just south of downtown.

Major intersections

References

203